USS Dianthus (SP-639) was a United States Navy patrol vessel in commission from 1917 to 1918.

Dianthus was built as a private motorboat of the same name by the Herreshoff Manufacturing Company at Bristol, Rhode Island, in 1913. On 21 May 1917, the U.S. Navy acquired her under a free lease from her owner, John P. Crozer of Upland, Pennsylvania, for use as a section patrol boat during World War I. She was commissioned as USS Dianthus (SP-639) on 26 May 1917.

Assigned to the 4th Naval District, Dianthus performed patrol duty for the rest of World War I.

Dianthus was decommissioned on 27 November 1918 and returned to Crozer the same day.

Notes

References

Department of the Navy Naval History and Heritage Command Online Library of Selected Images: U.S. Navy Ships: USS Dianthus (SP-639), 1917–1918
NavSource Online: Section Patrol Craft Photo Archive Dianthus (SP 639)

Patrol vessels of the United States Navy
World War I patrol vessels of the United States
Ships built in Bristol, Rhode Island
1913 ships